Energy in Singapore describes energy related issues in Singapore, which is a developed country located in Southeast Asia. Energy exports to others are about three times the primary energy supplied in the country itself. Additionally, oil imports in relation to the population demands of the country itself are concerningly high.

The world's largest palm oil company, Wilmar International, is based in Singapore, due to vast amount of forestation available for harvesting many products that rely on palm oil. A Finnish company operates the world's biggest palm oil-based diesel plant in Singapore with 800,000 tonnes produced annually since the end of 2010.

Overview 

According to the IEA Singapore had no energy production in 2008. Energy imports increased 18.6% in 2008 compared to 2004. The primary energy declined by about one third in 2007-8 but during the same period energy imports increased. Energy import was about three times the total primary energy supply in 2008. Compared to the UK in 2008, per capita electricity consumption was 135% and per capita carbon dioxide emissions were 110%. (UK: 61.35 m people 372.19 TWh electricity, 510.63Mt CO2 emissions).

The use of energy (primary energy) in Singapore is only 1/3 of the imported energy.

Singapore's Energy Story 
In 2019, then Minister for Trade and Industry Chan Chun Sing spoke about the Singapore Energy Story to guide the energy sector towards greater sustainability, while maintaining a reliable and affordable energy supply.

As part of its energy transition towards cleaner energy, Singapore will make use of four supply switches, supported with efforts in energy efficiency to reduce energy demand.

Natural Gas 
Around 95 per cent of Singapore's electricity is produced using piped or liquefied natural gas (LNG). Natural gas will remain a key fuel for Singapore's power generation as it scales up efforts harness solar and develop other low-carbon technologies.

In the early 2000s, Singapore started receiving natural gas from Malaysia and Indonesia via pipelines. To further diversify its gas sources, the city-state began importing LNG via the Singapore SLNG Terminal which began operations in May 2013.

In 2008, BG Group (which merged with Shell in 2016) won an exclusive franchise to supply as much as 3 million tonnes per annum (mpta) of LNG. Energy Market Authority (EMA) subsequently launched a competitive Request for Proposal process in 2014 which saw Shell Eastern and Pavilion Gas being appointed LNG importers in 2016. Another two term importers - ExxonMobil LNG Asia Pacific and Sembcorp Fuels - were subsequently appointed in 2021.

In 2022, Singapore launched a Request for Proposal to appoint up to two LNG importers to provide more options for gas buyers, in addition to the four term importers.

Solar 
Solar is considered to be Singapore's most viable renewable energy option, as the island nation is "alternative-energy disadvantaged" with low wind speeds, low tidal range, and no hydro resources.

In 2020, Singapore achieved its target of deploying 350 megawatt-peak (MWp) of solar. Under the Singapore Green Plan, the country aims to achieve 2 gigawatt-peak of solar by 2030, equivalent to powering around 350,000 households a year.

Singapore also aims to deploy 200 megawatts (MW) of energy storage systems beyond 2025 to mitigate solar intermittency and reduce peak demand. The first utility-scale energy storage system testbed was deployed at a substation in Woodlands in October 2020. EMA has also partnered with Keppel Offshore & Marine to pilot Singapore's first floating energy storage system.

Regional Power Grids 
Singapore plans to tap on regional power grids to access low-carbon electricity beyond its borders. It plans to import up to 4 gigawatts (GW) of low-carbon electricity by 2035, which could make up around 30 per cent of the country’s energy needs in 2035.

EMA had been carrying out trials to import electricity from regional power grids, such as a two-year trial to import 100 megawatts (MW) of electricity from Peninsular Malaysia, 100MW of electricity from Laos via the Lao DPR-Thailand-Malaysia-Singapore Power Integration Project (LTMS-PIP), and 100MW equivalent of non-intermittent electricity from a solar farm in Pulau Bulan, Indonesia.

In November 2021, EMA issued its first request for proposals to appoint electricity importers to import and sell about 1.2 GW of low-carbon electricity into Singapore, to begin by 2027. In July 2022, EMA issued its second request for proposals for low-carbon electricity imports, and streamlined the process to evaluate proposals from both proposal request exercises.

Low-Carbon Alternatives 
Singapore is also studying different low-carbon technologies such as hydrogen, carbon capture, utilisation and storage and geothermal energy for possible adoption in the longer term.

In October 2020, the Singapore Government announced a $49 million low-carbon energy research funding initiative to support research, development and demonstration projects in low-carbon technologies, such as hydrogen and carbon capture, utilisation and storage. This was later expanded to $55 million in 2021, with the funds going to 12 research projects.

In April 2022, EMA issued a Request for Information in its bid to assess the potential of geothermal energy across Singapore. EMA planned to follow up with a Request for Proposal to assess the viability and scalability of deploying geothermal systems in Singapore.

Energy Efficiency 
In 2018, EMA launched the Genco Energy Efficiency Grant Call to encourage power generation companies to adopt energy efficiency technologies by co-funding up to 50 per cent of their projects. This was part of the Enhanced Industry Energy Efficiency Package that was announced by the Singapore Government that same year. In October 2020, $23 million in grants were awarded to three power generation companies for energy efficiency projects.

The industrial sector can also tap on the Resource Energy Efficient Grant, supported by the Economic Development Board, and the Energy Efficiency Fund, supported by the National Environment Agency.

By end 2024, all households in Singapore will have advanced electricity meters installed in their premises that will enable them to track and manage their electricity consumption.

Singapore was the top 10th country in oil imports in 2008: 50 megatonnes.  For comparison, oil imports in Spain were 77 megatonnes (the top 8th country, with a population of 45.59 million) and in Italy they were 73 megatonnes (the top 9th country, with a population of 59.89 million).

Palm oil
The biggest palm oil-based diesel plant in the world, 800,000 t/a production, started operations in Singapore at the end of 2010 by Neste Oil from Finland. The plant requires almost a million tonnes of raw material annually from the oil palm Elaeis guineensis, equivalent to 2,600–3,400 km2 oil palm plantation.

Greenpeace demonstrated in November 2010 in Espoo, Finland, by hanging an orangutan puppet in front of Neste Oil, saying that Neste Oil endangers the rainforest ecosystem. According to UNEP the majority of new palm oil plantations take place in the rainforests.

According to European Union studies the increased demand for palm oil inevitably leads to new plantations being established in the forests and peat land areas. Land use changes have large green house gas emissions making palm oil diesel much more harmful than petroleum in respect to global warming. According to Greenpeace the Neste Oil plant in Singapore made Finnish Neste Oil among the world's leading palm oil consumers leading to increased rain forest destruction.

Reducing emissions from deforestation and forest degradation (REDD) would be a way to mitigate climate change. According to UNEP the international REDD mechanism will be a key element of [[Post–Kyoto Protocol negotiations on greenhouse gas emissions|the post-2012 international climate change]] regime.

Electricity 

The electricity sector in Singapore ranges from generation, transmission, distribution and retailing of electricity in Singapore.

Electricity sector in Singapore is regulated by the Energy Market Authority.

As of 2015, Singapore uses natural gas (95%) and waste (4%) for power stations' fuel. Oil used to contribute 23% in 2005 but now is down to 1%. The fossil fuel basis of Singapore's electricity system affects the way that electric cars are taxed.

Companies

 ES Power Singapore
 PacificLight Power Pte Ltd
 Keppel Merlimau Cogen Pte Ltd
 Keppel Seghers
 National Environment Agency
 PowerSeraya Ltd
 SembCorp Cogen Pte Ltd
 Senoko Energy Pte Ltd
 Tuas Power Ltd

Solar power 
Jurong Port is building a 10MW solar installation on the roofs of its warehouses. The system was expected online by the end of 2015. Singapore set a target of generating solar power to cover 350,000 households in 2030 that would correspond to 4% of the country's electricity demand in 2020. To promote renewable energy in the country it is advised that the government develops incentive and regulatory support mechanism; consolidate solar energy governance; mobilise equity investors and lenders; and specialise in the long-distance trade of renewable energy, especially in the form of hydrogen.

In July 2021 Sembcorp opened one of the world's largest floating solar plants, with 60 MWs of panels on a reservoir.

Given Singapore's leading position as a financial hub in the ASEAN region, it could maximise its role to promote clean energy investment throughout the entire region. The Australia–ASEAN Power Link is being considered to import 2.2 GW of solar from Northern Territory.

Companies

Wilmar International 
Wilmar International is listed in Singapore. Headed by Kuok Khoon Hong, it is the world's largest palm oil firm. Kuok was the third richest person in Singapore in 2009 with a net worth of $3.5 billion. According to Finnwatch in 2007 the Kuok family owned by Malaysian companies a biofuel plant in Indonesia (225 000 t/a). The Wilmar director Martua Sitorus ($3 billion net worth in 2009, 2nd richest in Indonesia) lived in Indonesia in 2009.

In July 2007 Friends of the Earth Netherlands and two Indonesian NGOs accused Wilmar of illegal forest clearances in West Kalimantan, inadequate Environmental Impact Assessments and clearing land outside its concessions. Wilmar denies the allegation.  The report calls on Unilever, a major purchaser from Wilmar, to review its purchasing relationship with the company.

Carbon dioxide emissions
Singapore was the 58th top carbon dioxide emitter per capita in the world.

References